Cavefish or cave fish is a generic term for fresh and brackish water fish adapted to life in caves and other underground habitats. Related terms are subterranean fish, troglomorphic fish, troglobitic fish, stygobitic fish, phreatic fish and hypogean fish.

There are more than 200 scientifically described species of obligate cavefish found on all continents, except Antarctica. Although widespread as a group, many cavefish species have very small ranges and are seriously threatened. Cavefish are members of a wide range of families and do not form a monophyletic group. Typical adaptations found in cavefish are reduced eyes and pigmentation.


Adaptations

Many aboveground fish may enter caves on occasion, but obligate cavefish (fish that require underground habitats) are extremophiles with a number of unusual adaptations known as troglomorphism. In some species, notably the Mexican tetra, shortfin molly, Oman garra, Indoreonectes evezardi and a few catfish, both "normal" aboveground and cavefish forms exist.

Many adaptions seen in cavefish are aimed at surviving in a habitat with little food. Living in darkness, pigmentation and eyes are useless, or an actual disadvantage because of their energy requirements, and therefore typically reduced in cavefish. Other examples of adaptations are larger fins for more energy-efficient swimming, and a loss of scales and swim bladder. The loss can be complete or only partial, for example resulting in small or incomplete (but still existing) eyes, and eyes can be present in the earliest life stages but degenerated by the adult stage. In some cases, "blind" cavefish may still be able to see: Juvenile Mexican tetras of the cave form are able to sense light via certain cells in the pineal gland (pineal eye), and Congo blind barbs are photophobic, despite only having retinas and optical nerves that are rudimentary and located deep inside the head, and completely lacking a lens. In the most extreme cases, the lack of light has changed the circadian rhythm (24-hour internal body clock) of the cavefish. In the Mexican tetra of the cave form and in Phreatichthys andruzzii the circadian rhythm lasts 30 hours and 47 hours, respectively. This may help them to save energy. Without sight, other senses are used and these may be enhanced. Examples include the lateral line for sensing vibrations,<ref>Burt de Perera, T. (2004). Spatial parameters encoded in the spatial map of the blind Mexican cave fish, Astyanax fasciatus. Anim.Behav 68: 291–295.</ref> mouth suction to sense nearby obstacles (comparable to echolocation), and chemoreception (via smell and taste buds). Although there are cavefish in groups known to have electroreception (catfish and South American knifefish), there is no published evidence that this is enhanced in the cave-dwellers. The level of specialized adaptations in a cavefish is generally considered to be directly correlated to the amount of time it has been restricted to the underground habitat: Species that recently arrived show few adaptations and species with the largest number of adaptations are likely the ones that have been restricted to the habitat for the longest time.

Some fish species that live buried in the bottom of aboveground waters, live deep in the sea or live in deep rivers have adaptations similar to cavefish, including reduced eyes and pigmentation.Uiblein, F.; Ott, J.A.; and Stachowitsch, M. (1996). Deep-sea and extreme shallow-water habitats: Affinities and Adaptations. Biosystematics and Ecology-Series, Band 11. .

The very limited food resources in the habitat likely prevents larger cavefish species from existing and also means that cavefish in general are opportunistic feeders, taking whatever is available. In their habitat, cavefish are often the top predators, feeding on smaller cave-living invertebrates, or are detritivores without enemies. Cavefish typically have low metabolic rates and may be able to survive long periods of starvation. A captive Phreatobius cisternarum did not feed for a year, but remained in good condition. The cave form of the Mexican tetra can build up unusually large fat reserves by "binge eating" in periods where food is available, which then (together with its low metabolic rate) allows it to survive without food for months, much longer than the aboveground form of the species.

In the dark habitat, certain types of displays are reduced in cavefish, but in other cases they have become stronger, shifting from displays that are aimed at being seen to displays aimed at being felt via water movement. For example, during the courtship of the cave form of the Mexican tetra the pair produce turbulence through exaggerated gill and mouth movements, allowing them to detect each other. In general, cavefish are slow growers and slow breeders. Breeding behaviors among cavefish vary extensively, and there are both species that are egg-layers and ovoviviparous species that give birth to live young. Uniquely among fish, the genus Amblyopsis brood their eggs in the gill chambers (somewhat like mouthbrooders).

Habitat

Although many cavefish species are restricted to underground lakes, pools or rivers in actual caves, some are found in aquifers and may only be detected by humans when artificial wells are dug into this layer.Moreira, C.R.; Bichuette, M.E.; Oyakawa, O.T; de Pinna, M.C.C.; and Trajano, E. (2010). Rediscovery and redescription of the unusual subterranean characiform Stygichthys typhlops, with notes on its life history. Journal of Fish Biology (London: Wiley InterScience) 76 (7): 1815–1824. Most live in areas with low (essentially static) or moderate water current, but there are also species in places with very strong current, such as the waterfall climbing cavefish. Underground waters are often very stable environments with limited variations in temperature (typically near the annual average of the surrounding region), nutrient levels and other factors. Organic compounds generally only occur in low levels and rely on outside sources, such as contained in water that enters the underground habitat from outside, aboveground animals that find their way into caves (deliberately or by mistake) and guano from bats that roost in caves. Cavefish are primarily restricted to freshwater. A few species, notably the cave-dwelling viviparous brotulas, Luciogobius gobies, Milyeringa sleeper gobies and the blind cave eel, live in anchialine caves and several of these tolerate various salinities.

Range and diversity
The more than 200 scientifically described obligate cavefish species are found in most continents, but there are strong geographic patterns and the species richness varies. The vast majority of species are found in the tropics or subtropics. Cavefish are strongly linked to regions with karst, which commonly result in underground sinkholes and subterranean rivers.

With more than 120 described species, by far the greatest diversity is in Asia, followed by more than 30 species in South America and about 30 species in North America.Riesch, R.; Tobler, M.; and Plath, M. (2015). Extremophile Fishes: Ecology, Evolution, and Physiology of Teleosts in Extreme Environments.  In contrast, only 9 species are known from Africa, 5 from Oceania, and 1 from Europe. On a country level, China has the greatest diversity with more than 80 species, followed by Brazil with more than 20 species. India, Mexico, Thailand and the United States of America each have 9–14 species. No other country has more than 5 cavefish species.

Being underground, many places where cavefish may live have not been thoroughly surveyed. New cavefish species are described with some regularity and undescribed species are known. As a consequence, the number of known cavefish species has risen rapidly in recent decades. In the early 1990s only about 50 species were known, in 2010 about 170 species were known, and by 2015 this had surpassed 200 species. It has been estimated that the final number might be around 250 obligate cavefish species. For example, the first cavefish in Europe, a Barbatula stone loach, was only discovered in 2015 in Southern Germany, and the largest known cavefish, Neolissochilus pnar (originally thought to be a form of the golden mahseer), was only definitely confirmed in 2019, despite being quite numerous in the cave where it occurs in Meghalaya, India. Conversely, their unusual appearance means that some cavefish already attracted attention in ancient times. The oldest known description of an obligate cavefish, involving Sinocyclocheilus hyalinus,  is almost 500 years old.

Obligate cavefish are known from a wide range of families: Characidae (characids), Balitoridae (hillstream loaches), Cobitidae (true loaches), Cyprinidae (carps and allies), Nemacheilidae (stone loaches), Amblycipitidae (torrent catfishes), Astroblepidae (naked sucker-mouth catfishes), Callichthyidae (armored catfishes), Clariidae (airbreathing catfishes), Heptapteridae (heptapterid catfishes), Ictaluridae (ictalurid catfishes), Kryptoglanidae (kryptoglanid catfish), Loricariidae (loricariid catfishes), Phreatobiidae (phreatobiid catfishes), Trichomycteridae (pencil catfishes), Sternopygidae (glass knifefishes), Amblyopsidae (U.S. cavefishes), Bythitidae (brotulas), Poeciliidae (live-bearers), Synbranchidae (swamp eels), Cottidae (true sculpins), Butidae (butid gobies), Eleotridae (sleeper gobies), Milyeringidae (blind cave gobies), Gobiidae (gobies) and Channidae (snakeheads). Many of these families are only very distantly related and do not form a monophyletic group, showing that adaptations to a life in caves has happened numerous times among fish. As such, their similar adaptions are examples of convergent evolution and the descriptive term "cavefish" is an example of folk taxonomy rather than scientific taxonomy. Strictly speaking some Cyprinodontidae (pupfish) are also known from sinkhole caves, famously including the Devils Hole pupfish, but these lack the adaptations (e.g., reduced eyes and pigmentation) typically associated with cavefish. Additionally, species from a few families such as Chaudhuriidae (earthworm eels), Glanapteryginae and Sarcoglanidinae live buried in the bottom of aboveground waters, and can show adaptions similar to traditional underground-living (troglobitic) fish. It has been argued that such species should be recognized as a part of the group of troglobitic fish.

Species
, the following underground-living fish species with various levels of troglomorphism (ranging from complete loss of eyes and pigment, to only a partial reduction of one of these) are known. Phreatobius sanguijuela and Prietella phreatophila'', the only species with underground populations in more than one country, are listed twice. Excluded from the table are species that live buried in the bottom of aboveground waters (even if they have troglomorphic-like features) and undescribed species.

Conservation

Although cavefish as a group are found throughout large parts of the world, many cavefish species have tiny ranges (often restricted to a single cave or cave system) and are seriously threatened. In 1996, more than 50 species were recognized as threatened by the IUCN and many, including several that are rare, have not been assessed at all. For example, the critically endangered Alabama cavefish is only found in the Key Cave and the entire population has been estimated at less than 100 individuals, while the critically endangered golden cave catfish only is found in the Aigamas cave in Namibia and has an estimated population of less than 400 individuals. The Haditha cavefish from Iraq and the Oaxaca cave sleeper from Mexico may already be extinct, as recent surveys have failed to find them. In some other cases, such as the Brazilian blind characid which went unrecorded by ichthyologists from 1962 to 2004, the apparent "rarity" was likely because of a lack of surveys in its range and habitat, as locals considered it relatively common until the early 1990s (more recently, this species appears to truly have declined significantly). Living in very stable environments, cavefish are likely more vulnerable to changes in the water (for example, temperature or oxygen) than fish of aboveground habitats which naturally experience greater variations. The main threats to cavefish are typically changes in the water level (mainly through water extraction or drought), habitat degradation and pollution, but in some cases introduced species and collection for the aquarium trade also present a threat. Cavefish often show little fear of humans and can sometimes be caught with the bare hands. Most cavefish lack natural predators, although larger cavefish may feed on smaller individuals, and cave-living crayfish, crabs, giant water bugs and spiders have been recorded feeding on a few species of cavefish.

Caves in some parts of the world have been protected, which can safeguard the cavefish. In a few cases such as the Omani blind cavefish (Oman garra), zoos have initiated breeding programs as a safeguard. In contrast to the rarer species, the cave form of the Mexican tetra is easily bred in captivity and widely available to aquarists. This is the most studied cavefish species and likely also the most studied cave organism overall. As of 2006, only six other cavefish species have been bred in captivity, typically by scientists.

See also
 Cave salamander

References

 
.